Omorgus alternans is a beetle of the family Trogidae found in Australia.

References

External links

alternans
Beetles of Australia
Beetles described in 1827